The Appleton-Hannaford House is a historic house on Hancock Road in Dublin, New Hampshire.  Built about 1785 for the son of an early settler, it is one of the town's oldest surviving buildings, and a little-altered example of Georgian residential architecture.  The house was listed on the National Register of Historic Places in 1983.

Description and history
The Appleton-Hannaford House is located in a rural setting in eastern Dublin, set in a small clearing on the north side of Hancock Road (New Hampshire Route 137) east of Greenwood Road.  It is a -story wood-frame structure, with a gabled roof, central chimney, and clapboarded exterior.  The main facade is five bays wide, with sash windows arranged symmetrically around the main entrance.  The first-floor windows have moulded surrounds with slightly projecting lintels.  The entrance is flanked by pilasters and topped by an entablature and fully pedimented gable.  A single-story ell extends to the right side.  The interior includes original wide board paneling.

The house was built c. 1785 by Isaac Appleton, a prominent local farmer and politician, and son of one of its early proprietors.  In addition to serving as town selectman and trustee of the town library, Appleton was also a representative in the state legislature.  The house passed to the related Richardson family in 1869, and was owned by the Hannafords (related to the Richardsons by marriage) until 1970.

See also
Appleton Farm, built by Isaac's brother Francis
National Register of Historic Places listings in Cheshire County, New Hampshire

References

Houses on the National Register of Historic Places in New Hampshire
Georgian architecture in New Hampshire
Houses completed in 1785
Houses in Dublin, New Hampshire
National Register of Historic Places in Dublin, New Hampshire